Heligolandic (Halunder) is the dialect of the North Frisian language spoken on the German island of Heligoland in the North Sea. It is spoken today by some 500 of the island's 1,650 inhabitants and is also taught in schools. Heligolandic is closely related to the insular North Frisian dialects of Fering and Öömrang because medieval fishery around Heligoland attracted Frisians from Föhr and Amrum, and close contacts have been maintained ever since. In fact Fering and Öömrang are closer in linguistic aspects to the dialect of Heligoland than to that of their neighbouring island Sylt, Söl'ring. Heligolandic also contains a variety of loanwords from 19th-century Modern English due to the 83-year British control of the island.

James Krüss is probably the most notable author of poems and narrations in Heligolandic while Maria Leitgeber (1906–1979) wrote the most substantial prose.

On 24 December 2004, a state law became effective in the German state of Schleswig-Holstein that recognises the North Frisian language for official use in the Nordfriesland district and on Heligoland.

References

See also 
 North Frisian (insular)
 Frisian languages

North Frisian language
Frisian